The 2020 Jayco Herald Sun Tour was a road cycling stage race that took place between 5 and 9 February 2020 in  Victoria, Australia. It was the 67th edition of the Herald Sun Tour and was a part of the 2020 UCI Oceania Tour.

Teams
Four UCI WorldTeams and nine UCI Continental teams were invited to the race. Along with an Australian national team, there were fourteen teams in the race. Of the 95 riders that started the race, 80 riders finished.

UCI WorldTeams

 
 
 
 

UCI  Continental Teams

 
 
 
 
 
 
 
 
 

National Teams

 KordaMentha Real Estate Australia

Route

Stages

Stage 1
5 February 2020 — Nagambie to Shepparton,

Stage 2
6 February 2020 — Beechworth to Falls Creek,

Stage 3
7 February 2020 — Bright to Wangaratta,

Stage 4
8 February 2020 — Mansfield to Mount Buller,

Stage 5
9 February 2020 — Melbourne,

Classification leadership table

Classification standings

General classification

Sprints classification

Mountains classification

Young rider classification

Teams classification

References

External links

2020
2020 UCI Oceania Tour
2020 in Australian sport
February 2020 sports events in Australia